Advenella mimigardefordensis is a bacterium from the genus Advenella. The complete genome of A. mimigardefordensis strain DPN7 has been sequenced. Tetrathiobacter mimigardefordensis has been reclassified to A. mimigardefordensis.

References

External links
Type strain of Advenella mimigardefordensis at BacDive -  the Bacterial Diversity Metadatabase

Burkholderiales
Bacteria described in 2009